Matthew M. Klein (born December 28, 1933) is an American politician who served as member of the North Dakota House of Representatives from 1993 to 2016. He was also the speaker of the House during the 2005 legislative session. He was succeeded as speaker by Rep. Jeff Delzer. Klein is an engineering consultant by trade.

He graduated from North Dakota State University with a degree in Electrical Engineering and did graduate studies at USC and UCLA. He served in the United States Air Force and is a member of the American Legion.

References

External links
North Dakota Legislature biography page

1933 births
Living people
North Dakota State University alumni
University of Southern California alumni
University of California, Los Angeles alumni
Speakers of the North Dakota House of Representatives
Republican Party members of the North Dakota House of Representatives
Military personnel from North Dakota
21st-century American politicians